Under the Constitutional Act of 1791, the district of Saint-Maurice was established.  Its boundaries, which roughly covered the current Mauricie area except for the city of Trois-Rivières, were reduced when the district of Champlain was created in 1829.

Saint-Maurice was represented simultaneously by two Members at the Legislative Assembly of Lower Canada.

Members for Saint-Maurice (1792-1838)

{| border="1" cellpadding="5" cellspacing="0" style="border-collapse: collapse border-color: #444444"
|- bgcolor="darkgray"
| 
|Name
|Party
|Election 

|Thomas CoffinTory Party1792

|Thomas CoffinTory Party1796

|Thomas CoffinTory Party1800

|David MonroTory Party1804

|Thomas CoffinTory Party1808

|Louis GugyTory Party1809

|François CaronParti Canadien1810

|Joseph-Rémi Vallières de Saint-RéalParti Canadien1814

|Louis GugyTory Party1816

|Pierre BureauParti Canadien1819

|Pierre BureauParti CanadienSpring 1820

|Pierre BureauParti CanadienSummer 1820

|Pierre BureauParti Canadien1824

|Pierre BureauParti Canadien1827

|Pierre BureauParti Canadien1830

|Pierre BureauParti Patriote1834

|Alexis Bareil, dit LajoieParti Patriote1836

|NameParty<td>Election

|Augustin Rivard-Dufresne<td>Parti Canadien<td>1792

|Nicholas Montour<td>Tory Party<td>1796

|Mathew Bell<td>Tory Party<td>1800

|Michel Caron<td>Parti Canadien<td>1804

|Michel Caron<td>Parti Canadien<td>1808

|Michel Caron<td>Parti Canadien<td>1809

|Michel Caron<td>Parti Canadien<td>1810

|Étienne Le Blanc<td>Parti Canadien<td>1814

|Étienne Mayrand<td>Tory Party<td>1816

|Louis Picotte<td>Parti Canadien<td>Spring 1820

|Louis Picotte<td>Parti Canadien<td>Summer 1820

|Charles Caron<td>Parti Canadien<td>1824

|Charles CaronParti Canadien1827

|Valère GuilletParti Canadien[[Legislative Assembly of Lower Canada|1830]]
{{Canadian party colour|QC|Liberal|row}}
|[[Valère Guillet]]<td>[[Parti Patriote]]<td>[[Legislative Assembly of Lower Canada|1834]]
{{Canadian party colour|QC|Liberal|row}}
|''[[François Lesieur Desaulniers]]''<td>''[[Parti Patriote]]''<td>''1836''
|}

Footnotes
{{Reflist}}

See also
[[History of Canada]]
[[History of Quebec]]
[[Mauricie]]
[[Politics of Canada]]
[[Politics of Quebec]]
[[Saint-Maurice—Champlain|Saint-Maurice—Champlain Federal Electoral District]]
[[Saint-Maurice (provincial electoral district)|Saint-Maurice]] (Quebec provincial electoral district)
[[Saint-Maurice (Province of Canada)|Saint-Maurice]] (electoral district in Canada East)
[[Shawinigan]]

[[Category:Electoral districts of Lower Canada]]
[[Category:1792 establishments in Lower Canada]]
[[Category:1838 disestablishments in Lower Canada]]
[[Category:Constituencies established in 1792]]
[[Category:Constituencies disestablished in 1838]]

{{Quebec-geo-stub}}